The Komandarm Fedko class is a class of replenishment tankers operated by the Indian and Chinese navies. Four ships of the Komandarm Fedko class were constructed by the Soviet Union, later Russia, of which one was bought by India, one by China and two are in commercial service. INS Jyoti (meaning "light") is the third largest ship in the Indian Navy after the aircraft carrier .

History 
 was constructed by the Admiralty Shipyard of St. Petersburg, Russia. It was built to be a Project 15966M merchant tanker, but was modified and purchased by the Indian Navy, and commissioned on 20 July 1996. The ship was based at Bombay, where it arrived in November 2006. It is deployed as a major force multiplier in sustaining the navy's blue water operations. INS Jyoti visited Shanghai in 2003, and participated in exercises by the Indian and Singapore navies in 2010.

Ships of the class

See also 

HSL-class fleet support ship

References

External links 
INS Jyoti refueling two frigates at sea during SIMBEX 2011
INS Jyoti in Exercise Malabar|Malabar 2011

Tankers of the Indian Navy
Auxiliary ships of the People's Liberation Army Navy
Auxiliary replenishment ship classes